Wysor Heights Historic District is a national historic district located at Muncie, Delaware County, Indiana. It encompasses 61 contributing buildings, 1 contributing site, and 1 contributing object in a predominantly residential section of Muncie.  The district developed between about 1890 and 1930, and includes notable examples of Queen Anne, American Foursquare, and Bungalow / American Craftsman style architecture.  Notable contributing resources include the equestrian sculpture and landscape ensemble "Appeal to the Great Spirit" by Cyrus Edwin Dallin (1929), Roy Thomas House (1922-1923), Burt Whiteley House (1892), and the first Delaware County Children's Home building (c. 1890).

It was added to the National Register of Historic Places in 1988.

References

External links

Historic districts on the National Register of Historic Places in Indiana
Queen Anne architecture in Indiana
Houses in Muncie, Indiana
Historic districts in Muncie, Indiana
National Register of Historic Places in Muncie, Indiana